Norton Crag is a rock summit in northeastern Halfway Nunatak, near the center of the upper Skelton Glacier. It is named after William L. Norton, United States Geological Survey (USGS) cartographer, member of satellite surveying team at South Pole Station, winter party, 1991

Cliffs of Victoria Land
Scott Coast